Christelle Doumergue-Le Guiader (28 November 1963 – 24 January 2023) was a French basketball player who played as a power forward.

Biography 
She started her career in 1973 with Frat Oullins and joined  in 1975. She began her senior career with Clermont UC in 1981. She retired from professional basketball in 2003 after playing for Stade Clermontois BF.

Doumergue made her debut for the French national team on 27 July 1979 against Yugoslavia and participated in the EuroBasket Women championship in 1980, 1985, 1987, and 1989. Her final national team game was played on 21 July 1989 against Senegal.

References 

1963 births
2023 deaths
French women's basketball players
France women's national basketball team players
Sportspeople from Lyon